Cephalalgiaphobia is fear of headaches or getting a headache. Cephalalgia is a Latin-based term for a headache, cephalic meaning head, and algia meaning pain. Harvey Featherstone introduced this phobia in the mid-1980s as a fear of having headache or migraine pain during a pain-free period  Patients with this phobia overuse analgesic medication to avoid headaches. Patients who experience these fears have a history of frequent migraines. To avoid a future headache or migraine a patient will intake analgesic medication to improve their headache. However, doctors do not prescribe pain medications but psychiatric medication to deal with the phobia itself. Non-pharmacological treatments using acupuncture therapy have been shown to reduce the fear of headache pain.


Prevalence

The prevalence of Cephalagiaphobia is not well known since there are few reported cases for statistical analysis. Patients would likely be unaware that their medication use is a phobic response. Cephalalgiaphobia: a possible specific phobia of illness reports a study of 12 patients which found a particular avoidance behavior among these people related to having chronic migraine attacks. Their research found a prevalence rate of cephalagiaphobia within their population study to be 60%. The patients in this study met diagnostic criteria for having a specific phobia based on the DSM-IV, even if it did not relate specifically to cephalagiaphobia.

Treatments

Known treatments for this phobia include medications prescribed to people who have anxiety, depression, and for other phobias; they include selective serotonin reuptake inhibitors, tricyclic antidepressants, benzodiazepines, and various types of psychotherapy. Non-medication treatments for headaches include acupuncture, which has been shown to reduce the fear of headache pain. "Acupuncture use for the treatment of headache prior to neurological referral" discusses the positive benefits on how acupuncture helps to relieve headache symptoms from patients that were studied.

References

Headaches
Phobias